The 23rd parallel south is a circle of latitude that is 23 degrees south of the Earth's equatorial plane, about 50 km north of the Tropic of Capricorn. It crosses the Atlantic Ocean, Africa, the Indian Ocean, Australasia, the Pacific Ocean and South America.

Around the world
Starting at the Prime Meridian and heading eastwards, the parallel 23° south passes through:

{| class="wikitable plainrowheaders"
! scope="col" width="125" | Co-ordinates
! scope="col" | Country, territory or ocean
! scope="col" | Notes
|-
| style="background:#b0e0e6;" | 
! scope="row" style="background:#b0e0e6;" | Atlantic Ocean
| style="background:#b0e0e6;" |
|-
| 
! scope="row" | 
| Passing just south of Walvis Bay
|-
| 
! scope="row" | 
|
|-
| 
! scope="row" | 
| Limpopo
|-
| 
! scope="row" | 
|
|-
| style="background:#b0e0e6;" | 
! scope="row" style="background:#b0e0e6;" | Indian Ocean
| style="background:#b0e0e6;" | Mozambique Channel
|-
| 
! scope="row" | 
|
|-
| style="background:#b0e0e6;" | 
! scope="row" style="background:#b0e0e6;" | Indian Ocean
| style="background:#b0e0e6;" |
|-valign="top"
| 
! scope="row" | 
| Western Australia Northern Territory Queensland
|-
| style="background:#b0e0e6;" | 
! scope="row" style="background:#b0e0e6;" rowspan="2" | Pacific Ocean
| style="background:#b0e0e6;" | Coral SeaPassing just north of Cato Reef in 's Coral Sea Islands Territory
|-
| style="background:#b0e0e6;" | 
|-
| 
! scope="row" | 
|
|-
| 
! scope="row" | 
|
|-
| 
! scope="row" | 
|
|-valign="top"
| 
! scope="row" | 
| Mato Grosso do Sul Paraná São Paulo - passing north of the city of São Paulo Rio de Janeiro - passing just south of the city of Rio de Janeiro
|-
| style="background:#b0e0e6;" | 
! scope="row" style="background:#b0e0e6;" | Atlantic Ocean
| style="background:#b0e0e6;" | Passing just south of the coast of 
|-
| 
! scope="row" | 
| Rio de Janeiro - Ilha do Cabo Frio
|-
| style="background:#b0e0e6;" | 
! scope="row" style="background:#b0e0e6;" | Atlantic Ocean
| style="background:#b0e0e6;" |
|}

See also
22nd parallel south
Tropic of Capricorn
24th parallel south

s23
Borders of the Cook Islands